Willow Lake, also known as the lower Willow Creek Lake, is an alpine lake in Saguache County, Colorado, United States, located in the Sangre de Cristo Range within the Sangre de Cristo Wilderness in Rio Grande National Forest.  The lake is accessed from the Willow Lake Trail (trail 865) at the South Crestone Lake Trailhead east of Crestone, Colorado. Willow Lake is directly north of Challenger Point and south of Mount Adams. Willow Creek is both the inflow and outflow to the lake, and there are waterfalls at both lake's inflow and outflow.

Gallery

References

Lakes of Colorado
Rio Grande National Forest
Bodies of water of Saguache County, Colorado